Double Deal is a 1981 Australian film about a bored wife of a rich man who has an affair and becomes a thief.

Angela Punch McGregor later said she was "amazed" to be offered the role of a model but accepted the part because she had not worked for a while.
I feared that if I didn't do it I would go down the plug hole The role was a mistake; the film was a mistake. But I didn't know that at the time. Brian Kavanagh turned out to be one of the most sensitive directors to actors that I have ever come across, but I don't think he should write his own scripts.
The film was made without government investment.

Cast

 Angela Punch McGregor as Christine Sterling
 Louis Jourdan as Peter Sterling
 Diane Craig as Miss Stevens
 Bruce Spence as Doug Mitchell
 Kerry Walker as Sibyl Anderson

Plot

Peter and Christine Sterling have an uneventful marriage. When a stranger comes into their lives, Christine is intrigued, and the two begin an affair. Things escalate and the two philanderers soon plot to rob Peter of a precious gemstone.

References

External links
 Double Deal at IMDb
 Double Deal at Oz Movies

Australian crime drama films
Films scored by Bruce Smeaton
1980s English-language films
1983 films
1983 crime drama films
1980s Australian films